Lyubcho Dyakov (Bulgarian: Любчо Дяков; born 17 May 1954) is a Bulgarian former sport shooter who competed in the 1976 Summer Olympics, in the 1980 Summer Olympics, and in the 1988 Summer Olympics.

References

1954 births
Living people
Bulgarian male sport shooters
ISSF pistol shooters
Olympic shooters of Bulgaria
Shooters at the 1976 Summer Olympics
Shooters at the 1980 Summer Olympics
Shooters at the 1988 Summer Olympics
Olympic bronze medalists for Bulgaria
Olympic medalists in shooting
Medalists at the 1980 Summer Olympics